Chloe Pirrie (born 25 August 1987) is a Scottish actress. She has played main roles in the 2014 miniseries The Game, the 2012 film Shell, and the 2015 television film An Inspector Calls. She has also appeared in the 2016 miniseries War & Peace, the 2015 film Youth, the 2015 film Blood Cells and "The Waldo Moment", a 2013 episode of Black Mirror. In 2015 she also co-starred in the Academy Award winner for Best Live Action Short Film Stutterer.

Early life
Pirrie was raised in Stockbridge, Edinburgh, and attended the Mary Erskine School. She began acting in school and decided to pursue it as a career after being cast in a school production of The Cherry Orchard. She moved to London at the age of 18 to attend the Guildhall School of Music and Drama and graduated in 2009.

Career
Pirrie's professional acting career began in 2009. She made her debut at the Royal National Theatre in a 2010 production of Men Should Weep alongside numerous other Scottish actors. Shortly afterwards, she appeared in Solstice, a short film released in 2010. Her first role in a feature film was in Shell (2012), a Scottish drama in which Pirrie played the eponymous main character. For this performance she won Most Promising Newcomer at the British Independent Film Awards 2013 and was nominated for Best British Newcomer at the 2012 BFI London Film Festival Awards. In 2013, she played a politician in "The Waldo Moment", an episode of the anthology series Black Mirror. In the same year she was named as one of BAFTA's "Breakthrough Brits" and Screen Internationals "UK Stars of Tomorrow".

In 2014, Pirrie starred in the BBC miniseries The Game, a Cold War spy thriller in which she played an MI5 secretary. The following year she appeared as Sheila Birling in Helen Edmundson's BBC One adaptation of J. B. Priestley's An Inspector Calls, in the miniseries The Last Panthers, the British independent film Burn Burn Burn, and the Italian film Youth.

In 2015, she starred as Ellie in the Academy Award winner for Best Live Action Short Film, Stutterer. 

She played Julie Karagina in the 2016 BBC miniseries War & Peace and was cast as Emily Brontë in To Walk Invisible, a BBC drama about the Brontë family created by Sally Wainwright. She also starred in the Death In Paradise episode 'In The Footsteps Of A Killer' as Grace Matlock, an employee at the Saint Marie Times.

She also plays Lara in the 2016 BBC thriller series, The Living and the Dead. In 2017, she starred in the Netflix series The Crown for its second season, playing Eileen Parker. In 2018, she appeared as Andromache in the BBC/Netflix miniseries Troy: Fall of a City.

In 2019, she appeared as prosecutor Ella Mackie in BBC's thriller miniseries The Victim.

In 2020, she appeared in Autumn de Wilde's film adaptation of Jane Austen's novel Emma as Isabella Knightley, elder sister of the titular character played by Anya Taylor-Joy. Later that year she also appeared in the Netflix miniseries The Queen's Gambit as Alice Harmon, the birth mother of Beth Harmon (also played by Anya Taylor-Joy).

Filmography

Film

Television

References

External links
 

Living people
1987 births
21st-century Scottish actresses
Actresses from Edinburgh
People educated at the Mary Erskine School
Alumni of the Guildhall School of Music and Drama